The FIL European Luge Championships 1951 took place in Igls, Austria under the auspices of the Fédération Internationale de Bobsleigh et de Tobogganing (FIBT - International Bobsleigh and Tobogganing Federation in ) under their "Section de Luge", a trend that would continue until the International Luge Federation (FIL) was formed in 1957. It marked the first time these championships would be held after the end of World War II in 1945. Host nation Austria made history by becoming the first nation to sweep the medals in all three events at these championships.

Men's singles

Women's singles

Men's doubles

Medal table

References
Men's doubles European champions
Men's singles European champions
Women's singles European champions

FIL European Luge Championships
1951 in luge
Luge in Austria
1951 in Austrian sport